The High Court of Justice is a political court in Cameroon. The court judges high-ranking members of the government of Cameroon, including the president, prime minister, ministers, and vice ministers, in the event that they are charged with high treason or conspiracy against national security. It is composed of nine judges and six substitute judges who are elected by the National Assembly of Cameroon. The court is headquartered in Yaoundé.

Notes

References

 "Cameroon". The World Factbook. United States Central Intelligence Agency. 12 December 2006. Accessed 20 December 2006.
 Fonge, Fuabeh P. (1997). Modernization without Development in Africa: Patterns of Change and Continuity in Post-Independence Cameroonian Public Service. Trenton, New Jersey: Africa World Press, Inc.

Law of Cameroon
Government of Cameroon
Yaoundé